Norman Lloyd (16 October 1895 – 5 March 1983) was an Australian landscape painter.

Norman Lloyd was born in 1895 near Newcastle, New South Wales, where he attended primary school. He left school in 1911 and started to work and study painting with Julian Ashton and James R. Jackson in Sydney.

On his 21st birthday in 1916 he enlisted with the Australian Imperial Forces and was transported to Europe where he was seriously wounded in battle a year later. After returning to Sydney in February 1918, he took up painting lessons at the Julian Ashton Art School again. From 1921 to 1926, Lloyd exhibited with galleries in Sydney and Melbourne, showing landscapes and Sydney harbour scenes painted in the more traditional style of his teachers.

From 1926 to 1929, Norman Lloyd visited Europe and travelled widely in Italy and France, exhibiting in the UK, France and Australia, culminating in a solo exhibition at Macquarie Galleries in Sydney.

In the 1930s, Lloyd migrated to London with his wife Edith for good, setting up a boarding house in upmarket St Johns Wood and establishing himself quickly in the new society, being a kind, generous and interested man with a broad horizon. His mansion became a meeting point and home for many Australian expats, among them painters Will Ashton, Alison Rehfisch and George Duncan. The Lloyds hosted pianist Nancy Weir, and war correspondent Harold Fyffe was a close friend, who introduced Lloyd to H G Wells and George Bernard Shaw.

Lloyd established himself also professionally, when he was elected member of the exclusive Royal Institute of Oil Painters (ROI) in 1936 and of the London Sketch Club, over which he presided during 1941 to 1942.

He also kept his connection with Australia by becoming a Fellow of the Royal Art Society of New South Wales, and in 1949 Henry Hanke’s portrait of Norman Lloyd was chosen to be hung in the Archibald Prize of the Art Gallery of New South Wales.

From 1933 until 1970, Lloyd exhibited regularly with the ROI, and showed at the Royal Academy of London. The titles testify of Lloyd’s love for mediterranean Europe - Italy, Spain, France, Turkey and Morocco, inspiring joyful land, sea and mountainscapes, in a style that evoked impressionism. Lloyd was a prolific painter who was able to paint fast, preferring textural oil and pastels.

From 1947 onwards, Lloyd spent the summers with Zénaide Chaumette - whom he had met in Paris after the war - in the heart of France in Chassignoles.

After the death of Zénaide Chaumette in 1954, Lloyd was willed Chaumette’s house in Chassignolles until he died, and it seems that he moved to Chassignolles permanently in 1974, at the age of 80 after the death of his wife, Edith.  He was later found wandering in a confused state in Paris unable to speak, having had a stroke.  Fortunately he was able to communicate that he had friends in Chassignolles which led to the involvement of a nephew in England.  The nephew was contacted and arrangements made for him to live in a nursing home in Yorkshire where he died on 5 March 1983. The ‘Times’ of London printed a short obituary.

In 1989, 1990, Lloyd’s work was shown at Savill Galleries in Sydney alongside a number of important Australian artists. In 1990 Christopher Day Gallery, Sydney, dedicated a solo exhibition to Norman Lloyd, and 1991 saw his work again at a group exhibition in Deutscher Fine Art, Melbourne.

Lloyd’s work is now represented in the Art Gallery of Western Australia, the Queensland Art Gallery, the University of Sydney Art Collection and numerous private collections in Australia, Europe and US.

Curriculum vitae 
 1895    16 October, born in Hamilton near Newcastle, NSW, Education at Hamilton School
 1911    Leaves home. Various manual jobs. Studies with James R. Jackson and Julian Ashton
 1916    Enlists in the Australian Imperial Force on his 21st birthday. Serves as Private in the 19th Battalion
 1916    Embarks on 11 November on the [[SS Suevic|HMAT Suevic]] in Sydney
 1917    20 September, seriously wounded at Polygon Wood
 1918    14 February, returns to Sydney on HMAT Runic
 1918    14 May, discharged from Forces for medical reasons
 1918    Studies painting again with Julian Ashton at the Julian Ashton Academy in Sydney
 1921    Exhibition of oil paintings of Sydney Harbour at Decoration Galleries, Melbourne
 1922    Exhibition at Fine Art Galleries, Melbourne
 1924    Exhibition at Anthony Hordern with the Younger Group of Australian Artists
 1925    Second Exhibition at Anthony Hordern with the Younger Group of Australian Artists
 1925?   Returns to Europe to study and travel
 1926    Exhibition at Macquarie Galleries, Sydney in June. Exhibition at Dunster Galleries, Sydney
 1926–1929 Travels in Europe and England. Lloyd exhibits works at the Royal Academy, the Paris Salon, the Liverpool and Glasgow galleries. Receives an invitation to show at the International Society’s Gallery at Pittsburgh, Pennsylvania
 1929    Exhibition of selected works at the Paris Salon, Société des Artistes Français "Views of Australia"
 1929    Solo Exhibitions at Macquarie Galleries, Sydney. Fine Art Society's Gallery, Melbourne
 1930–1974 Lives in London, St John's Wood, at 66 Avenue Road, then 61 Marlborough Place and later on 63 Marlborough Place
 1931   Exhibition at Leger’s Gallery, Old Bond Street, London
 1932   Exhibits works with the Royal Institute of Oil painters, London
 1933   Exhibition at Leger’s Gallery, Old Bond Street, London
 1933   Exhibits works with the Royal Institute of Oil painters, London (ROI)
 1933   Exhibits paintings at the Royal Academy, London
 1934   Listed in ‘Who’s Who in Art – 1934’
 1934   Exhibits works with the ROI, London
 1935   Exhibits works with the ROI, London
 1936   Member of the ROI
 1936   Exhibits works with the ROI, London
 1937   Exhibits works with the ROI, London
 1938   Listed with the Royal Institute of Oil Painters and as Fellow of the Royal Society of Artists (FRSA)
 1938   Exhibits works at the Royal Academy, London
 1938   Exhibits works with the ROI, London
 1939   Exhibits works with the ROI, London
 1940   Exhibits works with the ROI, London
 1941–1942 President of the London Sketch Club
 1940   Royal Academy of Arts, United Artists’ Exhibition
 1944   Liaison officer in Paris after the liberation of France, meets Zenaïde Chaumette
 1944–1974 Regular visits to Chassignolles
 1947   Exhibits works with the ROI, London
 1947   Exhibits works at Le Salon, Société des Artistes Français
 1948   Exhibits works with the ROI, London
 1949   Exhibits works with the ROI, London
 1949   Exhibits works at Le Salon, Société des Artistes Français
 1949   Exhibits at Salon d’Hiver
 1950   Exhibits works with the ROI, London
 1950   Exhibits works at Le Salon, Société des Artistes Français
 1951   Exhibits works with the ROI, London
 1951   Exhibits works at Le Salon, Société des Artistes Français
 1951   Exhibits at Salon d’Hiver
 1952   Exhibits works at Le Salon, Société des Artistes Français
 1953   Exhibits works at Le Salon, Société des Artistes Français
 1953   Exhibits works with the ROI, London
 1954   Exhibits works at Le Salon, Société des Artistes Français
 1954   Exhibits works with the ROI, London
 1955   Exhibits works at Le Salon, Société des Artistes Français
 1956   Exhibits works with the ROI, London
 1962   Exhibits works at Le Salon, Société des Artistes Français
 1963   Exhibits works with the ROI, London
 1964   Michael Kmit exhibition, Melbourne
 1964   Exhibits works with the ROI, London
 1965   Exhibits works with the ROI, London
 1966   Exhibits works with the ROI, London
 1970   Exhibits works with the ROI, London
 1974   Exhibits works at Stewart’s of London and Donegal
 1974–1976 The ROI lists Normans Lloyd's address as Chassignolles, 36/400 Indre, France
 1975   Exhibition at Davids-Bartlow Gallery, Columbus, Ohio
 1976   Exhibition at Davids-Bartlow Gallery, Columbus, Ohio
 1978   Exhibits at Koch Galleries, Mobile, Alabama
 1983   5 March, dies in Keighley, Yorkshire

 References 

 National Archives of Australia, Canberra
 Library of the Art Gallery of New South Wales, Sydney
 Victoria and Albert Museum Archives
 Exhibition Catalogue Christopher Day Gallery, Paddington, Sydney: Norman Lloyd – Retrospective Exhibition, 21 June – 7 July 1990
 Gillian Tindall, Célestine – Voices from a French Village'' (Minerva, published 1996 by Mandarin Paperbacks)

External links
 

1895 births
1983 deaths
20th-century Australian painters
20th-century Australian male artists
Julian Ashton Art School alumni
Australian male painters